Gaisal railway station is a railway station on Katihar–Siliguri branch of Howrah–New Jalpaiguri line in the Katihar railway division of Northeast Frontier Railway zone. It is situated beside National Highway 31 at Dhantola, Gaisal of Uttar Dinajpur district in the Indian state of West Bengal. It is also remembered for the famous Gaisal train disaster.

Accident
At 1:45 am on 2 August 1999 Avadh Assam Express and Brahmaputra Mail collided near Gaisal railway station. The crash involved such high speeds that the trains exploded upon impact, killing at least 285 people and injured nearly 300.

References

Railway stations in Uttar Dinajpur district
Katihar railway division